The Telangana Pradesh Congress Committee (or Telangana PCC) is the state unit of the Indian National Congress (INC) in the state of Telangana, India.

List of presidents

History
The first president is Ponnala Lakshmaiah, who was appointed on 11 March 2014, after the bifurcation of Andhra Pradesh. 2 months after Lakshmaiah got appointed, the Congress suffered a disastrous defeat in the 2014 Andhra Pradesh Legislative Assembly elections, in which it got 0 out of the 175 seats in the Coastal Andhra and Rayalseema regions whereas in Telangana it managed to muster a measly 21 out of the 119 seats. The party lost almost 25pp of its vote in the united state, more than half of its vote in 2009. K. Chandrashekhar Rao (known popularly as KCR) of the Telangana Rashtra Samithi stormed to power, riding on a wave of support due to finally achieving Telangana's independence, after years of protests and hunger strikes. The Congress then got routed in the GHMC elections, getting only 2 seats in the 150-member civic body, a far cry from its combined tally of 95 in its coalition with the AIMIM earlier.

In the 2018 Telangana Legislative Assembly elections, the Congress forged an alliance with the Telangana Jana Samithi, the Telugu Desam Party, and the Communist Party of India. Once arch rivals, these parties came together with the common goal of unseating the TRS and KCR. This alliance was known as the "Maha Kootami" or Grand Alliance. The alliance won only 21 seats in the elections out of which the Congress got 19. The alliance in total got about 33% of the vote. The TRS was able to increase its majority from 63 to 88 seats.

In the 2020 Greater Hyderabad Municipal Corporation elections, the Congress only got 2 seats, following which the state president N. Uttam Kumar Reddy resigned from his position as TPCC president, although still continued as its president until the party found a new president for the state unit. This led to political stalwart Revanth Reddy being appointed as state party chief in 2021.

Telangana Legislative Assembly election

Lok Sabha election history

Office Bearers

Headquarters
The headquarters are located at Gandhi Bhavan, near Nampally in Hyderabad, the capital city of Telangana.

Activities

Membership drive
Then Telangana PCC under the leadership of Ponnala started a membership drive across all districts in the Telangana State. According to the sources while the initial target was 10 lakh registrations, TPCC was surprised by the response received from the people of Telangana. The target now is revised to 17 lakhs registrations by the end of Dec 2014. Membership Booklets were distributed as part of this membership drive. The theme of this membership drive was "I am an Indian, I am a member of Indian National congress".

Telangana Vileena Dinam
PCC chief Ponnala Lakshmaiah announced on 17 September as the Telangana Vileena Dinam (Telangana combined day). Telangana Congress party leaders celebrated the event in Gandhi Bhavan, Hyderabad. During his speech he reminded everyone that the dream of separate Telangana state was achieved due to Sonia Gandhi's UPA Government's efforts.

2023 Telangana Legislative Assembly election

Protests and Incidents 
On 5 August 2022, Indian National Congress held a protest against price rise and GST on essential food items at Indira Park in Hyderabad. Congress Legislative Party leader Mallu Bhatti Vikramarka and Mulug MLA Seethakka were present at the protest.

References

External links
 

Political parties in Telangana
Indian National Congress by state or union territory
Politics of Telangana
2014 establishments in Telangana
Political parties established in 2014